Craspedocephalus brasiliensis is a taxonomic synonym that may refer to the pit viper species:

 Bothrops alternatus, a.k.a. the urutu, found in southeastern Brazil, Paraguay, Uruguay and northern Argentina
 Bothrops jararaca, a.k.a. the jararaca, found in southern Brazil, northeastern Paraguay and northern Argentina